Tore Down House is an album by the guitarist Scott Henderson, released in 1997. The album contains three instrumental tracks; it includes a cover version of "Continuum", originally a Jaco Pastorius song, and a re-recording of "Same as You", which appeared on Henderson's Dog Party. Thelma Houston sings on "Meter Maid", among other songs.

Critical reception
Stereo Review wrote that "wailing harp, percolating organ and punchy horns make a perfect foil for Scott's scalding, raunchy Strat tones." The Sydney Morning Herald thought that "what really makes this album work ... is Thelma Houston's wonderfully rich, gutsy vocals—a pleasant surprise."

Track listing
"Dolemite" – 5:52
"Tore Down House" – 7:37
"Meter Maid" – 4:29
"I Hate You" – 4:38
"Gittar School" – 5:10
"Xanax" – 5:38
"Continuum" – 4:00
"You Get Off On Me" – 3:53
"Mocha" – 7:29
"Harpoon" – 6:46
"Same as You" – 4:36

Personnel

 Thelma Houston – vocals 
 Masta Edwards – vocals on "I Hate You"
 Scott Henderson – guitars
 Scott Kinsey – keyboards
 Pat O'Brien – harmonica
 Albert Wing – alto sax, tenor sax, flute, Fearless Horn Section leader
 Walt Fowler – trumpet, flugel horn
 Mike Nelson – tenor sax, baritone sax
 Dan Fornero – trumpet, flugel horn
 Eric Jorgenson – trombone
 Dave Carpenter – bass
 Kirk Covington – drums and vocals
 T.J. Helmerich – background vocals
 Mark Nonisa – background vocals
 Richard Evans – Album cover design

References

External links
 George Graham reviews Tore Down House for WVIA-FM

1997 albums
Scott Henderson albums